Te John, Grease, & Wolfman is the second studio album by American musician Charlie Daniels, released in 1972. The name comes from the band members' nicknames. "Grease" was keyboardist Taz DiGregorio. Charlie Daniels was just "Charlie", sometimes, "the Fat Boy". It was released in 1972, courtesy of Kama Sutra Records.

Track listing
Side one

Side two

Personnel
Charlie Daniels - guitar, fiddle, mandolin, vocals
Taz "Grease" DiGregorio - keyboards, vocals
Earl "Te John" Grigsby - bass, vocals
Jeff "Wolfman" Myer - drums, percussion

Critical reception

Te John, Grease, & Wolfman received three and a half stars out of five from Michael B. Smith of Allmusic. Smith concludes that "Daniels rocks with the intensity of a downbound train on "Great Big Bunches of Love," and on his cover of the Jerry Lee Lewis chestnut "Drinkin' Wine, Spo-Dee-O-Dee." A true Southern poet, Charlie Daniels is seen here in the infancy of his artistic development, but even at this early stage, the poet is alive and well.".

References 

1972 albums
Charlie Daniels albums
Kama Sutra Records albums
Albums produced by Gary Klein (producer)
albums recorded at Electric Lady Studios